Face the Nation is an American news interview and panel discussion program that has aired on CBS since 1954.

Face the Nation may also refer to:

 Face the Nation (4Him album)
 Face the Nation (Kid 'n Play album)
 Face the Nation (Australian TV program), a 1958–1959 Australian panel discussion television program